Aksel Berget Skjølsvik (born 15 May 1987 in Åndalsnes) is a Norwegian former footballer who played as a midfielder or striker.

Skjølsvik started his football career with Åndalsnes IF. When he was 16 years old, he went to Rosenborg BK. Originally a second striker, Skjølsvik learned to play as an attacking midfielder as well in 2006. Skjølsvik is currently under contract with Sandnes Ulf from 2011 and is the team captain. On December 9 he signed a two-year deal with Sandnes Ulf. After the 2016 season Skjølsvik decided to retire from football to focus on his family.

Nonetheless he featured briefly for fourth-tier Brattvåg IL before joining fifth-tier Åndalsnes ahead of the 2018 season.

He represented his country at youth level.

Career statistics 
Source:

References

1987 births
Living people
People from Rauma, Norway
Norwegian footballers
Norway youth international footballers
Association football forwards
Rosenborg BK players
Molde FK players
Sandnes Ulf players
Eliteserien players
Norwegian First Division players
Sportspeople from Møre og Romsdal